Bremgarten may refer to:

Places

Germany
Bremgarten, Hartheim am Rhein, part of Hartheim am Rhein, Baden-Württemberg

Switzerland
Bremgarten bei Bern, in the canton of Bern
Bremgarten, Aargau, in the canton of Aargau
Bremgarten District, a district in the canton of Aargau

Other
Airport Bremgarten (IATA: EDTG), a former World War II airport near Bremgarten, Hartheim am Rhein
Bremgarten Castle, a castle in the municipality of Bremgarten bei Bern
Circuit Bremgarten, a former motor racing track near Bremgarten bei Bern
FC Bremgarten, a football team in the Swiss 2. Liga